The Maria reactor is Poland's second nuclear research reactor and is the only one still in use. It is located at Narodowe Centrum Badań Jądrowych (NCBJ) (National Center for Nuclear Research) at Świerk-Otwock, near Warsaw and named in honor of Maria Skłodowska-Curie. It is the only reactor of Polish design.

Maria is a multifunctional research tool, with a notable application in production of radioisotopes, research with utilization of neutron beams, neutron therapy, and neutron activation analysis. It operates about 4000 hours annually, usually in blocks of 100 hours.

Technical description
The technical details of the reactor are given in the references.

Maria is a pool type reactor with a power of 30 MW (thermal). Despite it being a pool reactor, it contains channels (aluminum tubes) individually connected to the primary coolant. The water pool provides cooling for elements (e.g., fuel elements) that are not otherwise cooled, and also acts as radiation shielding. Maria uses enriched uranium as fuel (80% enrichment in 235U till year 1999; 36% since). The fuel elements and channels are vertical but arranged conically. Water and beryllium blocks serve as the moderator (70% and 30% of the moderation, respectively). Elements of boron carbide sheathed in aluminum are utilized for control, compensation, and safety. The use of beryllium blocks results in a comparatively large fuel lattice pitch, and consequently large volume for payload targets. There is also a graphite reflector (aluminum sheathed). Maria supplies a neutron flux of 4x1014 n/cm2s (thermal neutrons) and 2x1014 n/cm2s (fast neutrons). There are six horizontal channels for controlled use of neutron beams. There is also a window of lead-containing glass through which the core can be viewed. The reactor is housed in a sealed containment.

Following preparation which started in 2004, Maria was converted to use low-enriched uranium (LEU) fuel by 2012.

History
Construction began on June 16, 1970 and the reactor was activated on December 18, 1974. With the shutdown of the Ewa reactor in 1995 it became Poland's only research nuclear reactor.

In 2015, Maria was relicensed for an additional 10 years of operation, through 2025.

Production of medical radioisotopes
In February 2010, it was announced that Maria will start producing medical isotopes in cooperation with Covidien, to help ease the isotope shortages due to shutdowns of the Canadian NRU reactor and the Dutch Petten nuclear reactor.

See also
Ewa reactor
Anna reactor
List of nuclear reactors

References

Nuclear research reactors
Nuclear research institutes
Research institutes in Poland
Neutron facilities

External links 
 https://www.ncbj.gov.pl/en